The House of Pavlović, also Radinović or Radenović, or Radinović-Pavlović, whose ancestors Jablanići got their name after their family estate at Jablan grad (Mezgraja, Ugljevik), was a medieval Bosnian family, whose feudal possessions extended from the Middle and Upper Drina river in the eastern parts of medieval Bosnia to south-southeastern regions of the Bosnian realm in Hum, and Konavle at the Adriatic coast. 
The family official residence and seat was at Borač and later Pavlovac, above the Prača river canyon, between present-day Prača, Rogatica and Goražde in Bosnia and Herzegovina.

History
Radin Jablanić was a local lord of the Krivaja valley and Prača region, and father of family's founder Pavle Radinović, who ruled a territory in the east and south to southeastern parts of the Bosnian Kingdom, from the late 14th century until his death in 1415.

Pavle Radinović plotted against then king of Bosnia, Ostoja, and his Grand Duke, Sandalj Hranić, which led to his assassination by Sandalj in Kraljeva Sutjeska in 1415. He was buried somewhere in Vrhbosna, it is speculated in today's Sarajevo outskirts, between suburb of Dobrinja and village of Tilava, in the areal named "Pavlovac".

Most prominent member of the family was Grand Duke of Bosnia, Radislav Pavlović, son of Pavle.

Family seat

Borač castle

The family hailed and ruled from Borač-Pavlovac. It's actually two castles rather than one, built in space of several decades (two generations) and few kilometers apart in distance from each others. These are simply known as Old Borač and New Borač or Pavlovac.

Pavlovac castle

The new castle of Borač is actually called Pavlovac, and is considered to be a new structure also known Novi, or Novi Grad. Problem exist in correct dating of its construction, but some medieval charters suggest 1392, or late 14th century, as time of its construction, during Radislav Pavlović at the family's helm.

Old Borač castle
However, historians are certain that another Radinović-Pavlović fortress existed, original and older Borač castle, which was built around 1244 in the 13th century and located just a few kilometers downstream the Prača river, near village Mesići, between villages of Borač i Brčigovo.

Possessions

Possessions, estates and castles of Radinović-Pavlović family:

Family tree
Radin Jablanić (-1391), minor Landlord (Vlasteličić)
Pavle Radinović (Founder) (1391–1415), Lord (Knez) and Duke (Vojvoda)
Petar I Pavlović (1415–1420), Duke (Vojvoda)
Radislav Pavlović (1420–1441), Grand Duke of Bosnia (since 1441), Lord (Knez) and Duke (Vojvoda)
Ivaniš Pavlović (1441–1450), Duke (Vojvoda)
Petar II Pavlović (1450–1463), Lord (Knez), Duke (Vojvoda)
Nikola Pavlović (1450–1463), Lord (Knez)

Religion

Basic expression of loyalty and affiliation for all Bosnian nobility during 14th and early 15th century, when Pavlović family ruled the central and eastern parts of Banat of Bosnia and then Kingdom of Bosnia, was their loyalty to the monarch, the kingdom, and the Bosnian Church.
Hence, all the members of Pavlović family, throughout 14th and early 15th century, were adherents of this religion, except duke Ivaniš Pavlović, who ventured into Catholicism.
So, it is known for certain that knyaz Pavle Radinović, his sons, duke Petar and knyaz and later grand duke Radislav Pavlović, as well as grand duke's Radislav sons, duke Ivaniš, prince Nikola and knyaz Petar Pavlović, were all adherents of the Bosnian Church.
Members and leaders of the Bosnian Church had had important role and influence at Pavlović's family courts through generations, first with knyaz Pavla's Radinović at his court, and later at the court of Grand Duke of Bosnia Radislav Pavlović, as well as with his brother, duke Petar, at his court. This continued with Radislav's sons as well, duke Ivaniš Pavlović, prince Nikola and knyaz Petar.
Actually, it was Grand Duke of Bosnia, Radislav Pavlović, who significantly increased a role and influence of the Bosnian Church's krstjani clergy, their members and leaders, with a state affairs. Historical documents noted frequent appearance of the Bosnian Church influential clergymen every time political and/or economic relations needed mediation, whether within Bosnia and its magnates, or between Bosnia and its neighbors, and most notably in relation with Dubrovnik. These mediation were numerous, especially between Bosnian elite and Dubrovnik, such as negotiations over sale of Radislav Pavlović's part of Konavale to Dubrovnik and mediation in ending Konavle war.

Coat of arms
The Radinović-Pavlović coat of arms, among others, was discussed in the book "Rodoslovne tablice i grbovi srpskih dinastija i vlastele", by group of Serbian authors, Aleksa Ivić, Dušan Mrđenović, Dušan Spasić, and Aleksandar Palavestra, from 1987. The subject of, and, at the same time, a main reference for this book are Illyrian Armorials, such as Fojnica and Ohmućević. Notably, all these armorials are in significant part fictional depiction of the medieval families coat of arms.
However, according to these authors, the "Illyrian Armorials" depict actual family coat of arms as a fortified city with three towers, on both the shield and the crest, with red shield and golden city on it, while the city in the crest is red, as well as the mantling with an interior of golden. The "Ohmućević Armorial" added three golden lilies in the shield, however, that interpretation is not in line with sphragistics, and is likely to be decorative.
The Pavlović family left six seals, which all have the same heraldic symbol, a tower, or fortified city. The oldest coat of arms is that of Pavle, dated to 1397, which has a fortified city with one tower. On the seals of his son, Radoslav, one has one tower (1432), the other three (1437), while Radoslav's son Ivaniš has three towers in his seal. The fortification is most likely modeled after Ragusan (today Dubrovnik) seals. This seal was likely used as the family coat of arms, despite the fact that there are no authentic complete coat of arms with shield, helmet and crest.

On the same subject other authors, like Ćiro Truhelka from 1914, and more recently Nada Grujić and Danko Zelić from 2010, and Amer Sulejmanagić from 2012, have different perspectives, from which they made different conclusions. Primarily, for them existence of the coat of arms (escutcheon, helmet and crest), created by artisan Ratko Ivančić in 1427 and still visible at the family palace in Dubrovnik, is not in dispute.
Thus, according to Croatian archaeologist Ćiro Truhelka and his study "Osvrt na sredovječne kulturne spomenike Bosne" from 1914, the Illyrian Armorials, according to its "ideological-propagandic message", used the red color in the coat of arms, instead of Radoslav Pavlović's coat of arms in Ragusa which used ultramarine.

On the same line, Nada Grujić and Danko Zelić, in their study from 2010, state that Radislav Pavlović's coat of arms was in gold and lapis lazuli. 
Radoslav Pavlović's coat of arms at his palace in Ragusa was made by Ratko Ivančić in 1427, measuring 1,28x1,28 m.

In two stećci in Boljuni near Stolac, there are engravings of a castle with three towers, which Šefik Bešlagić used to believe belonged to members of the family. On the other hand, there is an assumption that the necropolis at Pavlovac village, in Kasindo near Sarajevo, belonged to the family, thus, the resting place of the family remains unsolved.

Annotations

Sources

Further reading
M.A. Thesis: "Slavni i velmožni gospodin knez Pavle Radinović" by Amer Maslo, Sarajevo 2018, mentor: Doc.Dr. Emir O. Filipović (available for download in .pdf both at faculty website and Academia repository)

References

External links
U opštini Istočno Novo Sarajevo uništavaju stećke da bi se izgradio hotel / The East Novo Sarajevo Municipality is destroying the stećak tombstones to build a hotel - (video)
 / See how important cultural-historical heritage has been displaced in the territory of the Municipality of East Novo Sarajevo - part 1. to 6. (with photographs)

 
Kingdom of Bosnia